Deh Hasan (also Romanized as Deh Ḩasan) is a village in Emamzadeh Abu Taleb Rural District, in the Golestan District of Baharestan County, Tehran Province, Iran. At the 2006 census, its population was 1,153, in 293 families.

References 

Populated places in Robat Karim County